Southwestern Energy is a natural gas exploration and production company organized in Delaware and headquartered in Spring, Texas. The company is ranked 893rd on the Fortune 500.

The company's primary exploration and production activities are in the Appalachian Basin in Pennsylvania and West Virginia (73% of reserves) as well as the Haynesville Shale (27% of reserves). The company also controls 2,518,519 net undeveloped acres in New Brunswick, Canada, which are subject to an indefinite moratorium on hydraulic fracturing and cannot be developed at this time.

As of December 31, 2021, the company had 21.148 trillion cubic feet of natural gas equivalent of estimated proved reserves, of which 68% was natural gas, 29% was natural gas liquids, and 3% was petroleum, and all of which was in the Appalachian Basin.

History
The company traces its roots to Arkansas Western Gas Company, which was established in July 1929 as a subsidiary of Southern Union Gas Company of Dallas.

In 1985, the company acquired Mustang Fuel for $200 million in stock.

In 2013, the company acquired assets in the Marcellus Shale from Chesapeake Energy for $93 million.

In December 2014, the company acquired 413,000 net acres in the Upper Devonian, Marcellus and Utica shales in West Virginia and Southwest Pennsylvania from Chesapeake Energy for $5.375 billion.

In December 2018, the company sold its assets in the Fayetteville Shale for net proceeds of $1.65 billion.

Controversies

Public opposition to hydraulic fracturing in New Brunswick, Canada

In 2003, shale gas was discovered in New Brunswick, Canada. In March 2010, Southwestern successfully bid for exclusive licenses from the Department of Energy and Resource Development to conduct an exploration program. However, after protests by local citizens, in 2015, the provincial government in New Brunswick imposed a moratorium on hydraulic fracturing and in May 2016, the government announced that the moratorium would continue indefinitely.

References

External links

1929 establishments in Texas
Companies based in Houston
Companies listed on the New York Stock Exchange
Energy companies established in 1929
Natural gas companies of the United States
Non-renewable resource companies established in 1929